Ashton Hayes is a former civil parish, now in the parish of Ashton Hayes and Horton-cum-Peel, in Cheshire West and Chester, England.  It contains six  buildings that are recorded in the National Heritage List for England as designated listed buildings. Other than the village of Ashton Hayes, the parish is rural.  One of the buildings is listed at Grade II*, a farmhouse, and the others at Grade II; the latter consist of the village church and hall, a cottage, and a farm building.

Key

Buildings

See also

Listed buildings in Barrow
Listed buildings in Delamere
Listed buildings in Dunham-on-the-Hill
Listed buildings in Kelsall
Listed buildings in Manley
Listed buildings in Mouldsworth
Listed buildings in Tarvin

References
Citations

Sources

Listed buildings in Cheshire West and Chester
Lists of listed buildings in Cheshire